A list of films produced in France in 1955.

See also
 1955 in France
 1955 in French television

Notes

External links
 French films of 1955 at the Internet Movie Database
French films of 1955 at Cinema-francais.fr

1955
Films
French